Unryū (雲龍) or Cloud Dragon, a mythical creature in Japanese folklore, may refer to:

Warships
Unryū-class aircraft carrier, World War II Japanese aircraft carriers
 Japanese aircraft carrier Unryū, the lead ship of her class of fleet aircraft carriers built for the Imperial Japanese Navy (IJN) during World War II
 JS Unryū (SS-502), a Japanese Sōryū-class submarine launched in 2008

Other uses
Akari Unryu, an anime character
Unryū Kyūkichi, early 19th-century sumo champion
fiber from the paper mulberry tree is sometimes known as Unryū and is also known as Washi